The speckle-faced bent-toed gecko (Cyrtodactylus psarops) is a species of gecko that is endemic to southern Sumatra.

References 

Cyrtodactylus
Reptiles described in 2015